The term business operating system (BOS) refers to standard, enterprise-wide collection of business processes used in many diversified industrial companies. The definition has also been extended to include the common structure, principles and practices necessary to drive the organization.

Diversified industrial companies like Ingersoll Rand, Honeywell, and Danaher have adopted a standard, common collection of business processes and/or business process improvement methodologies which they use to manage strategy development and execution. In the case of Danaher, the business system is a core part of the company's culture and is seen as one of the key drivers of corporate performance.

The objectives of such systems are to ensure daily work is focused on the organisation's strategic objectives and is done in the most efficient way. The systems deal with the questions "why" (purpose of the work), "what" (specific objectives of the work) and "how" (the processes used to do the work). The Toyota Production System is focused on both how to make cars, and how to improve the way cars are made. A third objective can also be added, which is to improve the business system itself by identifying or improving the component tools and techniques.

Terminology 
Terms used to describe such systems include:
 XPS - meaning “Company-specific Production System" with the X standing in place of the company name
 Business System
 Management Operating System

Examples of business operating systems 
 Toyota's Toyota Production System (TPS) is one of the earliest examples, developed between 1948 and 1975
 Danaher is well known for its Danaher Business System (DBS)
 Fortive (a company that split from Danaher in 2016) has the Fortive Business System (FBS) which is derived from the DBS
 Ingersoll Rand established the Ingersoll Rand business operating system (BOS) to describe the six enterprise focus areas and its process improvement method (Lean Six Sigma).
 Honeywell has the Honeywell Operating System (HOS)
 United Technologies has the Achieving Competitive Excellence (ACE) Operating System 
 Magellan Operating System (Magellan Aerospace)

List of common features 
Many of business operating systems share common features. This is because the systems are derived from other known systems, and from established methods and practices for business management. The following is a list of features that appear in several systems.
 Hoshin Kanri, a strategic planning methodology developed by Yoji Akao, used to create goals, assign them measurable milestones, and assess progress against those milestones (Hoshin Kanri is also referred to as Policy Deployment or X-Matrix)
 Standard work - the best and most reliable methods and sequences for each work process which is used as the basis for sustaining improvements
 Process improvement methodologies: Lean, Six Sigma, and Kaizen are popular approaches incorporated in business systems 
 Just-in-time manufacturing
 Gemba walks
 Jidoka - "automation with a human touch" where human intervention is used to improve machine performance
 Visual controls or visual management where management processes (e.g. checking) use simple graphics to show problems at a glance
 Problem solving techniques such as root cause analysis
 Technology: While these standard business operating systems may inform or be linked to a company's technology platform, they more commonly refer to the way the company manages complex business processes in a common way across its diverse portfolio of businesses.

References 

Business terms